This is a list of the Swiss Hitparade number-one hits of 2022.

Swiss charts

References
 Swiss No.1 Singles and Albums 2022

Number-one hits
Switzerland
2022